The Central Coast Athletic Association (CCAA) is a high school athletic conference in California that is affiliated with the CIF Central Section. The association was established in 2018 as the Central Coast Athletic Conference and consists of 16 schools in San Luis Obispo and Santa Barbara counties that previously were members of the CIF Southern Section and three of its constituent conferences, the Pac-8, the Los Padres League, and the Channel League. 

In earlier decades, previously-branded leagues such as the Northern League, Central Coast League and Tri-County League were also home to several of the 16 total schools, realigned over the years largely due to enrollment, which today comprise the overall spectrum of the association. (The aforementioned Tri-County League, which was smaller than the peer Northern League and LPL in terms of enrollment, was originally entitled as such due to also including high schools from neighboring Kern and Fresno counties at the time, in addition to San Luis Obispo County.)

Briefly, the association also reached into the Pacific View and Channel leagues on a football basis, but heading into the fall of 2022, the alignment was simplified to revert back to a more historical format when Cabrillo, Lompoc and Santa Ynez rejoined the CCAA's fellow 13 schools in the Central Section and, thus in turn, its Mountain and Ocean leagues. As the Santa Maria Times assessed of the unison of all 16 programs: "It's just two leagues and two counties. Again, a much more natural fit." 

In some sports with individually-based results, such as track and field or wrestling, the association holds combined meets including almost all of the schools in one meet, regardless of assigned league; it also often announces awards and honors simultaneously. The CCAA, which spans the 805 area code, uses a system of promotion and relegation to place each school's teams, by sport and gender, into either of two leagues periodically based on performance.

Member schools
 Arroyo Grande High School
 Atascadero High School
 Cabrillo High School
 Lompoc High School
 Mission College Preparatory High School
 Morro Bay High School 
 Nipomo High School 
 Orcutt Academy High School 
 Paso Robles High School
 Pioneer Valley High School
 Righetti High School
 St. Joseph High School
 San Luis Obispo High School
 Santa Maria High School
 Santa Ynez Valley Union High School
 Templeton High School

League Championships for Football

References

CIF Central Section
Sports in Santa Barbara County, California